The  Moshchiny culture was an archaeological culture of the Iron Age from the 4th to the 7th century in present-day western Russia.

It is the easternmost known Baltic culture.

Distribution area 
The settlement area was located in the forest areas at the upper Dnepr and the upper Oka in today's Russian Oblast Kaluga, Tula, Oryol and Smolensk.

It is named after a settlement near the village  Moshchiny   in the Mosalsky District in the Kaluga Oblast.

Genesis 
The Moshchiny  culture emerged in the 4th century from the Yukhnov culture, with influences from Zarubintsy culture due to immigration.  Moshchiny  culture  is related to the Dnieper-Dvina culture.

Material culture 
Agriculture and livestock were nutritional basis.
The settlements were mostly fortified.

The ceramic had a smooth surface with bronze ornaments. It was hand-molded.
Bronze and iron processing were highly developed.

Mortuary fire was buried in burial mounds.

Cultural changes 
For the period from the 9th century, the possibly Baltic-Slavic origin of the Vyatichi is mentioned in the western part of the area. For the 11th century on the Oka the probably Baltic tribe of Galindians (in particular  Eastern Galindians ).

See also 
Dniepr Balts

References

Literature 
  Matthias Albani Der Brockhaus Archäologie: Hochkulturen, Grabungsstätten, Funde Publisher Brockhaus, 671 pages, 2009 
 G.A. Massalitina:  Современное состояние изучения мощинской культуры. Оки связующая нить  (  The current status of research on Moschinsky culture Oka .) In: (Red.) EE Fomtschenko:  Археология Среднего Поочья: Сборник материалов Второй региональной научно-практической конференции (Ступино, 18 февраля 2009 г.)  ( Archeology of the Central Oka region Materials of the second regional scientific-practical conference (Studino, February 18, 2009) ). Moscow 2009, pp. 38–43

External links 
 Archaeological finds of the Iron Age in the Kaluga Oblast (Russian)
 Burial Cultures in the Oryol Oblast (Russian)
 Archaeological finds in Tula Oblast

Archaeological cultures of Eastern Europe
Iron Age cultures of Europe
Archaeological cultures in Russia
Baltic archaeological cultures